Frank Gouldsmith Speck (November 8, 1881 – February 6, 1950) was an American anthropologist and professor at the University of Pennsylvania, specializing in the Algonquian and Iroquoian peoples among the Eastern Woodland Native Americans of the United States and First Nations peoples of eastern boreal Canada.

Early life and education
Frank Gouldsmith Speck, son of Frank G. and Hattie Speck, was raised in urban settings (in Brooklyn, New York and Hackensack, New Jersey), with occasional summer family sojourns to rural Connecticut. He had two siblings: a sister, Gladys H. (8 years younger), and brother Reinhard S. (9 years younger). The Speck family was well-to-do, with live-in servants that included a German woman, Anna Muller, and a mixed Native American/African American woman, Gussie Giles from South Carolina. Around 1910, Frank married Florence Insley, from Rockland, New York, and they raised three children: Frank S., Alberta R., and Virgina C. Speck. The family lived in Swarthmore, Pennsylvania, also keeping a summer home near Gloucester, Massachusetts.

As a young man, Frank developed an affinity for forests and swamps and wild landscapes, and for the Native people who lived in these locales. These interests inspired him to pursue anthropological studies. He was accepted into Columbia University in 1899. After working closely with professor and linguist John Dyneley Prince, who encouraged his interests in Native American Indian language and culture, he was introduced to anthropologist Franz Boas.

Around 1900, during a summer camping trip to Fort Shantok, Connecticut, while on break from Columbia. Speck was surprised to encounter a group of Mohegan Indian young men about his own age. Burrill Fielding, Jerome Roscoe Skeesucks, and Edwin Fowler introduced him to about 80 other members of their tribe living in Uncasville, near Fort Shantok, in Mohegan, Connecticut. Speck took a particular interest in Fidelia Fielding, an elderly widow who (unlike most of her neighbors) still fluently spoke the Mohegan Pequot language. Modern sources suggest that Speck was raised by Fidelia, but there is no evidence in Mohegan tribal records to support this notion. There is, however, no question that Speck's "interests in literature, natural history and Native American linguistics" were inspired by his early encounters with Mohegan people.

At Columbia University, Speck found his direction for life study as an anthropological ethnographer. He received his BA from Columbia in 1904, and proceeded to initiate fieldwork among the Yuchi Indians, receiving his M.A. in 1905. From 1905 to 1908, he continued his work on Yuchi data, receiving his Ph.D. from the University of Pennsylvania (1908), with his dissertation supervised by Boas. This ethnography focused on the Yuchi people of Oklahoma, among whom he worked in 1904, 1905, and 1908.

Career
In 1907, the University of Pennsylvania (Penn) awarded Frank G. Speck a one-year George Lieb Harrison Fellowship as a research fellow at the University Museum (now the University of Pennsylvania Museum of Archaeology and Anthropology). Assistant Curator of Archaeology and Ethnology George Byron Gordon arranged for Speck to receive a dual appointment, as both Assistant in Ethnology at the University Museum, and Instructor of Anthropology for the University. Speck was assigned to teach the introductory course in Anthropology. The Harrison Fellowship was next held in 1908 by another of Boas's students, Edward Sapir, a specialist in linguistic anthropology.

Speck received a series of re-appointments in his dual position of Assistant in Ethnology/Instructor of Anthropology until 1912, when he was appointed as a full-time faculty member in the new Department of Anthropology. By 1913, after a contentious split with Penn Museum Director Gordon, Speck was appointed as Chair of the Department. He headed the Department for four decades, stepping down only after his health failed in 1949.

Speck was unique among many anthropologists of his generation in choosing to study American Indians close to home, rather than people of more distant lands. The pressures of relocation, boarding schools, cultural assimilation, and economic marginalization had, however, caused many Native American people to lose traditional lands, material, and culture. Speck found that his work constituted, in effect, a "salvage operation" to try to capture ethnological material during a time of great stress for Indigenous people. He began his efforts among Native Americans in New England, and soon expanded to regions as far afield as Labrador and Ontario in Canada.

Among his students at Penn, Speck nurtured a generation of prominent anthropologists, including: A. Irving Hallowell, Anthony F. C. Wallace, and Loren Eiseley, among many others. Speck also sponsored a few Native American students at Penn: his research assistant Gladys Tantaquidgeon and, for a brief time, Molly Spotted Elk. In 1924, Speck arranged to enroll Tantaquidgeon in Penn's College Courses for Teachers. Over time, their positions evolved from teacher/student to intellectual colleagues, and he encouraged her to take charge of independent research projects among Delaware, Wampanoag, and Mohegan peoples. Margaret Bruchac has examined the academic relationship between Frank Speck and Gladys Tantaquidgeon in her book called Savage Kin.

Speck especially loved fieldwork and typically camped and traveled with the people he studied. During an era of extreme social stratification and white elitism, Speck did not hesitate to invite his Native informants to join him in his field research, to offer lectures in his classroom, and to stay in his home. Colleagues and students like Ernest Dodge, Carl Weslager, Loren Eisely, and Edmund Carpenter later recalled that Speck was extraordinarily accepting of, and seemed most comfortable among, Indians and other people of color. William Fenton recalled that Speck would often absent himself from academic functions when Native American informants came to visit him in Philadelphia.

During his fieldwork with the Iroquois, Speck became close to members of the Seneca Nation, who marked their relationship by giving him the name Gahehdagowa ('Great Porcupine') when he was adopted into the Turtle clan of the Seneca people. Such adoptions were a means of assigning a kinship position to outsiders who were welcome guests; they did not, however, constitute tribal membership. Speck was particularly interested in how family and kinship systems underlay tribal organizations and relations to homelands and natural resources. In Canada, he developed maps of individual family bands' hunting territories to document Algonquian land rights. These later became crucial to Native American land claims.

From the 1920s through the 1940s, Speck also studied the Cherokee in the Southeast United States and Oklahoma. Through the years, he worked extensively with tribal elder Will West Long of Big Cove, western North Carolina. Speck credited Long as co-author of his 1951 book Cherokee Dance and Drama, along with his colleague Leonard Bloom.

Speck was elected to numerous professional associations, where he took an active role on committees, such as the American Association for the Advancement of Science, American Anthropological Association, American Ethnological Society, Geographical Society of Philadelphia, and Archaeological Society of North Carolina (honorary). He conducted work for the American Museum of Natural History in New York, and the Smithsonian Institution in Washington, DC.

Collections
Frank G. Speck collected thousands of Native American objects, along with many reels of audio recordings, reams of transcriptions, and photographs, which have been distributed into multiple museums, most notably the Museum of the American Indian (now the National Museum of the American Indian), Canadian Museum of Civilization (now History), and Peabody Essex Museum.

Speck's papers were collected and archived by the American Philosophical Society, of which he was a member. There are also collections of his papers at the Canadian Museum of History in Gatineau, Quebec and at the Phillips Library of the Peabody Essex Museum in Salem, Massachusetts

Works
 The Study of the Delaware Indian Big House Ceremony (1931) Harrisburg : Pennsylvania Historical Commission 
 Naskapi: The Savage Hunters of the Labrador Peninsula (1935, reprint 1977) 
 Contacts between Iroquois Herbalism and Colonial Medicine (1941) 
 The Tutelo Spirit Adoption Ceremony (1942) Harrisburg : Commonwealth of Pennsylvania, Dept. of Public Instruction, Pennsylvania Historical Commission.
 "Songs from the Iroquois Longhouse." (1942) Program notes for an album of American Indian music from the eastern woodlands, Washington, DC: Library of Congress.
 The Iroquois: A Study in Cultural Evolution (1945), Cranbrook Institute of Science 
 The Roll Call of the Iroquois Chiefs (1950) 
 Symposium on Local Diversity in Iroquois Culture (1951) Washington, DC: US Government Printing Office.
 The Iroquois Eagle Dance: an Offshoot of the Calumet Dance (1953) 
 The False Faces of the Iroquois (1987) 
 
 The Little Water Medicine Society of the Senecas (2002) 
Midwinter Rites of the Cayuga Long House (1949)

References

Further reading
 Blankenship, Roy (1991) "The Life and Times of Frank G Speck, 1881-1950" Philadelphia: University of Pennsylvania. With chapters by John Witthoft, William N. Fenton, Ernest S. Dodge, C.A. Weslager, Edmund S. Carpenter, Anthony F.C. Wallace and Claudia Medoff.
 Bruchac, Margaret M. (2018) "Indian Stories: Gladys Tantaquidgeon and Frank Speck." In Savage Kin: Indigenous Informants and American Anthropologists, pp. 140–175. Tucson: University of Arizona Press.
 Darnell, Regna (2006) "Keeping the Faith: A Legacy of Native American Ethnography, Ethnohistory, and Psychology", in New Perspectives on Native North America: Cultures, Histories, and Representations, ed. by Sergei A. Kan and Pauline Turner Strong, pp. 3–16. Lincoln: University of Nebraska Press.
 Fenton, William N. (2001) "He-Lost-a-Bet (Howanʼneyao) of the Seneca Hawk Clan", in Strangers to Relatives: The Adoption and Naming of Anthropologists in Native North America, ed. by Sergei Kan, pp. 81–98. Lincoln: University of Nebraska Press.
 Wallace, Anthony F.C. (1986) "The Value of the Speck Papers for Ethnohistory," in 'The American Indian: A conference in the American Philosophical Society', American Philosophical Society Library Publication, No. 2, pp. 20–26.
 Pulla, Siomonn (2000) "From Advocacy to Ethnology: Frank Speck and the Development of Early Anthropological Projects in Canada, 1911-1920, 2000." Masters Thesis, Carleton University, Department of Anthropology.
 Pulla, Siomonn (2003) "Frank Speck and the Moisie River incident: anthropological advocacy and the question of Aboriginal fishing rights in Québec." Anthropologica: 129-145.
 Pulla, Siomonn (2006) "Frank Speck and the Mapping of Aboriginal Territoriality in Eastern Canada, 1900--1950."  Department of Sociology and Anthropology Thesis (Ph.D.), Carleton University.
 Pulla, Siomonn (2008). " 'Would you believe that, Dr. Speck?' Frank Speck and The Redman's Appeal for Justice."Ethnohistory, 55(2), 183-201.
 Pulla, Siomonn (2011). "A Redirection in Neo-Evolutionism?: A Retrospective Examination of the Algonquian Family Hunting Territories Debates." Histories of Anthropology Annual, 7(1), 170-190.
Pulla, Siomonn. (2016). Critical Reflections on (Post) colonial Geographies: Applied Anthropology and the Interdisciplinary Mapping of Indigenous Traditional Claims in Canada during the Early 20th Century. Human Organization, 75(4), 289.

Sources
 Smithsonian Institution Research Information System

External links
 
 

American folklorists
People from Brooklyn
1881 births
1950 deaths
University of Pennsylvania alumni
Columbia College (New York) alumni
University of Pennsylvania faculty
Members of the American Philosophical Society
Linguists of Algic languages
Linguists of Siouan languages
20th-century American anthropologists
Presidents of the American Folklore Society